The Dunedin Theatre Awards are annual theatre awards in Dunedin, New Zealand. The awards were established in 2010 by director and actor Patrick Davies, and the winners are selected by a panel of theatre reviewers. The winners are selected by the Dunedin Reviewers Collective.

2010 awards 
The first awards were presented by Mayor Dave Cull in December 2010 at an event held at the Fortune Theatre. The panel of reviewers who selected the winners consisted of Anna Chinn, Jimmy Currin, Barbara Frame, Terry MacTavish, Sharon Matthews, and Jen Aitken. The awards were criticised when 6 out of 7 awards were won by the Fortune Theatre, and no awards were given to visiting production Miss Saigon. Founder of the awards Patrick Davies said that the awards explicitly excluded children's theatre, musical theatre or "anything to do with education" from consideration, but that categories for those types of production might be included the following year. The OSTAs (Otago Southland Theatre Awards) were launched in 2013 to reward achievements in musical theatre.

2011 Awards 
The 2011 Awards were held at the Playhouse Theatre on 12 December 2011.

2012 awards 
In 2012 a decision-making matrix was introduced to the judging process to try to achieve a fairer result. New awards were introduced for emerging talent, industry support, outstanding contribution to Dunedin theatre and for lifetime achievement. The awards ceremony was held at the Mayfair Theatre on 11 December.

2013 awards 
The 2013 awards were held at the Globe Theatre on 15 December.

2014 awards 
The 2014 awards at were held at the Fortune Theatre on 16 December. A new nationwide initiative to honour longevity and commitment to theatre was launched, with awards for practitioners involved in 25, 50 and 100 professional shows. Shirley Kelly, Louise Petherbridge, and Hilary Norris were honoured for completing more than 100 professional shows. For more than 50 professional shows, Martyn Roberts, Lisa Warrington, Lara Macgregor, Terry MacTavish, Peter King, Julie Edwards and Simon O'Connor were honoured. In the third category, for more than 25 professional shows, honours went to Hilary Halba, Karen Elliot, Vivien Aitken, Barry Dorking, Matthew Wilson and Patrick Davies.

2015 awards 
The sixth annual awards were held at the Allen Hall Theatre on 7 December.

2016 awards 
The 2016 awards were held on the 5 December at the Fortune Theatre.

2017 awards 
The 2017 award ceremony was held on 4 December at the Athenaeum Theatre.

2018 awards 
The 2018 awards were held at Hanover Hall on 10 December, and presented by Louise Petherbridge.

2019 awards 

The tenth anniversary Dunedin Theatre Awards were held at Hanover Hall on 2 December. The awards were presented by Dunedin Theatre Awards founder Patrick Davies. Special presentations were made for longstanding achievements in theatre to Chris Manley, John Watson, and Playhouse Theatre, with a further special award recognising the recent UNESCO Cities of Literature Short Play Festival, and an award for the production of the decade.

2021 awards 
An awards ceremony on 13 December 2021 at Hanover Hall celebrated productions during 2020 and 2021. Winners were:

References 

New Zealand theatre awards
Theatre in New Zealand
New Zealand awards
Culture in Dunedin